FAW Car Company Limited, a subsidiary of FAW Group in Changchun, Jilin, China. It has been listed on the Shenzhen Stock Exchange since 1997. Its passenger car marques include Bestune, FAW, Hongqi and Oley.

References

External links
FAW Car Limited Company

Companies listed on the Shenzhen Stock Exchange
FAW Group divisions and subsidiaries
Companies based in Changchun
Government-owned companies of China
Vehicle manufacturing companies established in 1997